Glenroy T. Johnson is a former West Indian cricket umpire. He stood in six ODI games between 1989 and 2001.

See also
 List of One Day International cricket umpires

References

Year of birth missing (living people)
Living people
West Indian One Day International cricket umpires
Place of birth missing (living people)